"Take Me Out to the Ball Game" is a 1908 Tin Pan Alley song by Jack Norworth and Albert Von Tilzer which has become the unofficial anthem of North American baseball, although neither of its authors had attended a game prior to writing the song. The song's chorus is traditionally sung as part of the seventh-inning stretch of a baseball game. Fans are generally encouraged to sing along, and at some ballparks, the words "home team" are replaced with the team name.

History of the song
Jack Norworth, while riding a subway train, was inspired by a sign that said "Baseball Today – Polo Grounds". In the song, Katie's (and later Nelly's) beau calls to ask her out to see a show. She accepts the date, but only if her date will take her out to the baseball game. The words were set to music by Albert Von Tilzer. (Norworth and Von Tilzer finally saw their first Major League Baseball games 32 and 20 years later, respectively.) The song was first sung by Norworth's then-wife Nora Bayes and popularized by many other vaudeville acts. It was played at a ballpark for the first known time in 1934, at a high-school game in Los Angeles; it was played later that year during the fourth game of the 1934 World Series.

Norworth wrote an alternative version of the song in 1927. (Norworth and Bayes were famous for writing and performing such smash hits as "Shine On, Harvest Moon".) With the sale of so many records, sheet music, and piano rolls, the song became one of the most popular hits of 1908. The Haydn Quartet singing group, led by popular tenor Harry MacDonough, recorded a successful version on Victor Records.

The most famous recording of the song was credited to "Billy Murray and the Haydn Quartet", even though Murray did not sing on it. The confusion, nonetheless, is so pervasive that, when "Take Me Out to the Ball Game" was selected by the National Endowment for the Arts and the Recording Industry Association of America as one of the 365 top "Songs of the Century", the song was credited to Billy Murray, implying his recording of it as having received the most votes among songs from the first decade.  The first recorded version was by Edward Meeker.  Meeker's recording was selected by the Library of Congress as a 2010 addition to the National Recording Registry, which selects recordings annually that are "culturally, historically, or aesthetically significant".

Lyrics
Below are the lyrics of the 1908 version, which is out of copyright.
Katie Casey was baseball mad,
Had the fever and had it bad.
Just to root for the home town crew,
Ev'ry sou1
Katie blew.
On a Saturday her young beau
Called to see if she'd like to go
To see a show, but Miss Kate said "No,
I'll tell you what you can do:"

Chorus

Take me out to the ball game,
Take me out with the crowd;
Buy me some peanuts and Cracker Jack,
I don't care if I never get back.
Let me root, root, root for the home team,
If they don't win, it's a shame.
For it's one, two, three strikes, you're out,
At the old ball game.

Katie Casey saw all the games,
Knew the players by their first names.
Told the umpire he was wrong,
All along,
Good and strong.
When the score was just two to two,
Katie Casey knew what to do,
Just to cheer up the boys she knew,
She made the gang sing this song:
 Original lyric, sung by Edward Meeker, recorded in 1908 on a phonograph cylinder
 Lyrics to 1927 version

1 The term "sou", a coin of French origin, was at the time common slang for a low-denomination coin. In French the expression 'sans le sou' means penniless. Carly Simon's version, produced for Ken Burns' 1994 documentary Baseball, reads "Ev'ry cent/Katie spent".

Though not so indicated in the lyrics, the chorus is usually sung with a pause in the middle of the word "Cracker", giving 'Cracker Jack' a pronunciation "Crac---ker Jack". Also, there is a noticeable pause between the first and second words "root".

Recordings of the song
The song (or at least its chorus) has been recorded or cited countless times since it was written. The original music and 1908 lyrics of the song are now in the public domain in the United States (worldwide copyright remains until 70 years after the composers' deaths), but the copyright to the revised 1927 lyrics remains in effect. It has been used as an instrumental underscore or introduction to many films or skits having to do with baseball.

The first verse of the 1927 version is sung by Dan Hornsby for Columbia Records 1544-D (148277).  Gene Kelly and Frank Sinatra at the start of the MGM musical film, Take Me Out to the Ball Game (1949), a movie that also features a song about the famous and fictitious double play combination, O'Brien to Ryan to Goldberg.

In the early to mid-1980s, the Kidsongs Kids recorded a different version of this song for A Day at Old MacDonald's Farm.

In the mid-1990s, a Major League Baseball ad campaign featured versions of the song performed by musicians of several different genres. An alternative rock version by the Goo Goo Dolls was also recorded. Multiple genre Louisiana singer-songwriter Dr. John and pop singer Carly Simon both recorded different versions of the song for the PBS documentary series Baseball, by Ken Burns.

In 2001, Nike aired a commercial featuring a diverse group of Major League Baseball players singing lines of the song in their native languages. The players and languages featured were Ken Griffey Jr. (American English), Alex Rodriguez (Caribbean Spanish), Chan Ho Park (Korean), Kazuhiro Sasaki (Japanese), Graeme Lloyd (Australian English), Éric Gagné (Québécois French), Andruw Jones (Dutch), John Franco (Italian), Iván Rodríguez (Caribbean Spanish), and Mark McGwire (American English).

The song in popular culture
The iconic song has been used and alluded to in many different ways.
 
In the 1935 Marx Brothers' film A Night at the Opera, in one of the more unusual uses of the song, composer Herbert Stothart arranged for a full pit orchestra to segue seamlessly from the overture of Il trovatore into the chorus of "Take Me Out to the Ball Game".

A 1954 version by Stuart McKay  shifted the lyrics two syllables forward to make the song end surprisingly early. In McKay's version the initial "Take me" was sung as an  unaccented pickup, causing the final "Game" to land on the same note as "Old" in the original, and leaving last two notes unsung.

In 1955, in an episode of I Love Lucy guest starring Harpo Marx, Harpo performed a harp rendition of the song.

A version is heard during the end credits of the 1978 film The Bad News Bears Go To Japan. The first verse is sung by Japanese children, later accompanied by American singers.

In 1994, radio station WJMP, broadcasting to the Akron, Ohio market, played the song continuously during the Major League Baseball players' strike of 1994 as a protest.

In 1995 in the ER Season 2 episode "Hell and High Water", the character Doug Ross tells a child to keep singing the song to keep himself conscious.

The 2001 children's book "Take Me Out of the Bathtub and other Silly Dilly Songs" by Alan Katz and David Catrow, featuring silly words to well-known tunes, recast the end of the chorus as "I used one, two, three bars of soap. Take me out...I'm clean!" in its title number.

In 2006, Jim Burke authored and illustrated a children's book version of "Take Me Out to the Ballgame".

In 2006, Gatorade used an instrumental version of "Take Me Out to the Ballgame" in a commercial over video highlights of the United States Men's National Soccer Team in the lead-up to the 2006 FIFA World Cup, closing with the tagline "It's a whole new ballgame."

In 2008, Andy Strasberg, Bob Thompson and Tim Wiles (from the Baseball Hall of Fame) wrote a comprehensive book on the history of the song, Baseball's Greatest Hit: The Story of 'Take Me Out to the Ball Game'''. The book, published by Hal Leonard Books, included a CD with 16 different recordings of the song from various points in time, ranging from a 1908 recording by Fred Lambert, to a seventh-inning-stretch recording by Harry Caray.

Also in 2008, a parody of "Take Me Out to the Ball Game" was sung during an episode of the third season of the American game show Deal or No Deal on NBC. The contestant of that episode, Garrett Smith, was a baseball aficionado and a proud Atlanta Braves fan who even hoped to play for the team as a catcher. However, the lyrics were changed to lyrics that showed disdain for Smith, as this was a song that was penned by the Banker who then encouraged the in-studio audience to sing it to him.

The NHL used the song to promote the 2009 NHL Winter Classic between the Chicago Blackhawks and the Detroit Red Wings taking place at Wrigley Field on New Year's Day, 2009. At the time, it was the first Winter Classic to take place in a baseball stadium.

In the series Homeland Nicholas Brody teaches the song to Isa Nazir to help him learn English.

In the 2013 horror game Slender: The Arrival, this song may play on the radio in the first chapter of the game.

From March 13, 2015, the tune of "Take Me Out to the Ball Game" was adopted as the departure melody for trains on the Tokyo Metro Namboku Line at Kōrakuen Station in Tokyo, Japan. Baseball is popular in Japan, and Korakuen Station is one of the closest stations to the Tokyo Dome baseball stadium.

Instrumental parts of "Take Me Out to the Ball Game" can be heard in the background music for Joe E. Brown's 1932 movie Fireman, Save My Child.

In 1985, it was featured in Kidsongs "A Day at Old MacDonald's Farm", which shows the kids playing baseball. Also, Kirk Gibson of the Detroit Tigers is seen hitting a home run during the 1984 World Series.

The episode of Sam & Cat'' entitled "#MagicATM" featured the chorus, but with modified and nonsensical lyrics that start with "Take me down to the basement, fill the buckets with cheese."

In October 2016, Ghostbusters actor Bill Murray, a Chicago Cubs fan, impersonated Daffy Duck as he gave his rendition of the chorus of 'Take Me Out To The Ball Game' while at game 3 of the 2016 World Series, held at Wrigley Field.

In an Amazon Prime Original Series, named "Costume Quest", which aired on Amazon Prime Video for two seasons, the instrumental tune of  "Take Me Out to the Ball Game" is to be played in a harmonica for the door in Norm's junk shop to open which is filled with magical costumes.

In the Hulu series Only Murders in the Building, character Charles-Haden Savage played part of the chorus on a concertina (Season 1, Episode 4 "The Sting").
The piece for narrator and orchestra 'Lifting the Curse' with music by Julian Wachner and spoken text by Bill Littlefield extensively quotes the song in full orchestral array. It has been recorded on CD with The Landmarks Orchestra (Boston), Littlefield narrating.

Recordings
 Take me out to the ball game

Recognition and awards 
 2008:  The song won the Songwriters Hall of Fame Towering Song Award

References

External links

Stadium Symphonies (including "Take Me Out to the Ball Game") from the National Baseball Hall of Fame and Museum
Take Me Out to the Ball Game: A Centennial Tribute

1908 songs
1900s song stubs
Baseball culture
Songs written by Albert Von Tilzer
Songs written by Jack Norworth
Baseball music
United States National Recording Registry recordings
Vaudeville songs